Herbert Thompson may refer to:

Herbert Hugh Thompson, security consultant
Herbert Thompson (Egyptologist) (1859–1944), British Egyptologist
Herbert Thompson (Leicestershire cricketer) (1886–1941)
Herbert Thompson (Surrey cricketer) (1869–1947), English cricketer
Herbert J. Thompson (1881–1937), American Thoroughbred racehorse trainer
Herbert Thompson Jr. (1933–2006), American prelate of the Episcopal Church

See also
Bert Thompson (disambiguation)

Herbert Thomson